Anna Skripka is a Ukrainian-American mathematician whose research topics include noncommutative analysis and probability. She is a professor at the University of New Mexico.

Education and career
Skripka did her undergraduate studies at the V. N. Karazin Kharkiv National University in Ukraine. She completed her Ph.D. at the University of Missouri. After working as a visiting assistant professor at Texas A&M University and as an assistant professor at the University of Central Florida, she joined the University of New Mexico Department of Mathematics and Statistics in 2012, where she is currently a full professor.

Recognition
Skripka is the 2019 winner of the Ruth I. Michler Memorial Prize of the Association for Women in Mathematics.

References

External links
Home page

Year of birth missing (living people)
Living people
American mathematicians
American women mathematicians
Ukrainian mathematicians
Ukrainian women mathematicians
National University of Kharkiv alumni
University of Missouri alumni
University of New Mexico faculty